Challengers is a settlement on the south coast of the island of Saint Kitts in Saint Kitts and Nevis. It is located to the west of the capital Basseterre, on the main road to Old Road Town.

References

 https://www.historicstkitts.kn/places/challengers

Populated places in Saint Kitts and Nevis
Trinity Palmetto Point Parish